Thomas Harcourt may refer to:

Thomas Harcourt (Medal of Honor) (1841–?), American sailor stationed aboard the USS Minnesota during the American Civil War
Thomas Whitbread (1618–1679) alias Harcourt, English Jesuit missionary, wrongly convicted of conspiracy to murder Charles II of England
Thomas Harcourt (MP) for Stafford (UK Parliament constituency)